The Ministry of General Education and Instruction (MOGEI) is a national ministry of the Government of South Sudan in the current Transitional government of national Unity that is responsible for primary and secondary education, as well as the training of educators, in the Republic of South Sudan. The incumbent minister is Awut Deng Acuil.

List of Ministers of General Education and Instruction

See also
 Ministry of Higher Education, Science and Technology (South Sudan)

References

Education, Science and Technology
South Sudan
South Sudan
South Sudan, Education, Science and Technology